Alfonso Castaldo (6 November 1890 – 3 March 1966) was an Italian cardinal of the Roman Catholic Church. He served as Archbishop of Naples from 1958 until his death, and was elevated to the cardinalate in 1958.

Biography

Alfonso Castaldo was born in Casoria to Aniello Castaldo (died  1897) and Marianna Crispino. The third of five children, he was baptized in his home four days later, on 10 November, by his paternal uncle, who was a canon by the same name, with the permission of the Naples curia. Castaldo, influenced by Monsignor Francesco Morano and Father Luigi Maglione, decided to pursue a career in the Church, and attended the seminaries in Cerreto Sannita, Pozzuoli, and Naples. He also studied philosophy and letters at the University of Naples.

Ordained a priest by Bishop Angelo Jannacchino on 8 June 1913, Castaldo served as a chaplain to the Italian Army (1915–1918), and a provost in Casoria (1918–1934). On 27 March 1934 he was appointed Bishop of Pozzuoli by Pope Pius XI. Castaldo received his episcopal consecration on the following 30 June from Cardinal Alessio Ascalesi, CPPS, with Bishops Salvatore del Bene and Salvatore Meo serving as co-consecrators.

Pope Pius XII named him coadjutor archbishop of Naples, titular archbishop of Thessalonica, and apostolic administrator of Pozzuoli on 14 January 1950. Castaldo became Archbishop of Naples on 7 February 1958 and was created cardinal priest of S. Callisto by Pope John XXIII in the consistory of 15 December that same year. On the following 5 August he was named Bishop ad personam of Pozzuoli.

The Cardinal attended the Second Vatican Council from 1962 to 1965, and was one of the electors who participated in the 1963 papal conclave, which selected Pope Paul VI. He was highly revered by the people of Naples, and was very involved in welfare, charitable, and educational activities.

Castaldo died in his archiepiscopal residence in Naples at age 75. He is buried in the Succorpo Chapel in the Cathedral of Naples.

References

External links
Cardinals of the Holy Roman Church
Catholic-Hierarchy 

1890 births
1966 deaths
20th-century Italian cardinals
Archbishops of Naples
20th-century Italian Roman Catholic archbishops
Participants in the Second Vatican Council
Cardinals created by Pope John XXIII
Royal Italian Army chaplains
World War I chaplains